"Cloud of Dust" is a song recorded by Canadian country music artist Rena Gaile. It was released in 1996 as the third single from her debut album, Out on a Limb. It peaked at number 10 on the RPM Country Tracks chart in July 1996.

The song was also recorded by Maureen McCormick on her 1995 album When You Get a Little Lonely.

Chart performance

References

1995 songs
1996 singles
Rena Gaile songs
Songs written by Judy Rodman